Trichloride may refer to:

 The trichloride ion, a polyhalogen ion
Antimony trichloride, SbCl3 also known as butter of antimony
Arsenic trichloride, AsCl3, also known as arsenous chloride or butter of arsenic
Boron trichloride, BCl3, a colorless gas and valuable reagent in organic synthesis
Butyltin trichloride, an organotin compound
Gallium trichloride, GaCl3
Iodine trichloride, ICl3
Nitrogen trichloride, NCl3, a yellow, oily, pungent-smelling liquid is most commonly encountered as a byproduct of reactions between ammonia-derivatives and chlorine
Phosphorus trichloride, PCl3, a yellow solid
Rhenium trichloride, ReCl3